WHIZ (1240 AM) is a commercial radio station licensed to Zanesville, Ohio, featuring a full service format known as "AM 1240 The Voice". Owned by Marquee Broadcasting, this station is the local affiliate for ABC News Radio, the Cincinnati Bengals, Cincinnati Reds, Columbus Blue Jackets and Ohio State Buckeyes radio networks, in addition to carrying ESPN Radio and Westwood One programming. WHIZ's studios are located in a combined facility with WHIZ-TV, WHIZ-FM and WZVL on Downard Road in Zanesville, while the transmitter is located to the northeast of the city's downtown. In addition to a standard analog transmission, WHIZ is relayed over low-power Zanesville translator W272EE and is available online.

Established in 1924 as WEBE in Cambridge, Ohio, the station was originally a small 10-watt operation until moving to Zanesville in 1930. The present call letters WHIZ were adopted in 1939, and the station was owned by the Littick family for 75 years as the "Southeastern Ohio Broadcasting System" (and often did business as the "WHIZ Media Group"). Under the Litticks, WHIZ built a companion television station and multiple FM radio stations.

History

Cambridge years

Roy W. Waller founded WHIZ in July 1924 as WEBE in Cambridge, Ohio; the first program went out from the station on July 25. The station broadcast from Waller's home on Fourth Street in that city; early programming featured music and market reports. The station continued regular broadcasts until the summer of 1926, when a lightning strike destroyed the facility. It was rebuilt at the same site and returned to operation by the end of the year.

The 10-watt outlet, which had broadcast on 1280 kHz, moved to 1210 kHz in 1927, but it almost did not survive to see the 1930s. As the Federal Radio Commission (FRC) sought to clean up the congested United States airwaves and implement the Davis Amendment to balance the relationship between radio stations and population, it targeted WEBE for removal, calling it a "bedroom" station—because it broadcast from Waller's actual bedroom—with homemade equipment that was, per chairman Ira E. Robinson, "assembled of parts of a questionable nature". The radio commission sent WEBE an order asking it to close by August 1, 1928. Waller successfully fought the order, noting that the small station was serving five counties with a total of 200,000 people and providing local programming of interest. The station also increased its power to 100 watts late in 1928.

Move to Zanesville
At the end of 1929, with Cambridge providing insufficient advertising revenue to pay for radio station operations, Waller applied to the FRC to move WEBE from Cambridge to Zanesville, with new studio and transmitter facilities in that city. The FRC approved in March 1930, and on May 26, WEBE in Cambridge was replaced with WALR in Zanesville. The WALR call letters, a shortening of Waller's name, were suggested to him by his bookkeeper.

WALR almost made a second move within several years of departing Cambridge for Zanesville. In November 1930, Waller filed to sell WALR to the Akron Broadcasting Company. That concern had been formed by Fred Ormsby to restore a second station to Akron, which had been reduced to one station when station WFJC left the air to make way for WGAR in Cleveland. The proposed Akron move was hotly contested; one man attempted to obtain a permanent injunction against any sale of the station. It also led to applications for new stations on the same frequency in Zanesville and in Cleveland, which were designated for hearing alongside WALR's license renewal and the proposed Akron sale and move in October 1931. In the meantime, the Cleveland Radio Broadcasting Company, which was to operate the station upon its move, took over operations of WALR in Zanesville, which Waller had been operating at a substantial loss; however, the Cleveland company lost nearly $5,000 in five months running the outlet. On December 31, 1931, the FRC denied permission for Waller to sell WALR. Instead, it was transferred to the WALR Broadcasting Corporation in 1932.

In 1934, WALR was again the subject of a proposed relocation to another city in Ohio, this time Toledo. This was originally approved by the new Federal Communications Commission (FCC) without a hearing in September; under the proposed move plans, the local staff of WALR in Zanesville was not to be retained. However, WJIM in Lansing, Michigan, protested the decision; it feared interference to its operations from the relocated outlet, noted that WJIM and WALR at Toledo would be too close together to permit both stations to broadcast at night, and suggested that WALR be made daytime-only if it were allowed to relocate. The case became controversial because the backer of the WALR/Toledo move and holder of an option to purchase stock in WALR's ownership, the Community Broadcasting Company (which also had a separate application for a station there), was supported by Fort Industry Stations, owner of competing Toledo station WSPD, and it was thought that WSPD might control the latter. The FCC denied the move in 1937 and instead allowed the Toledo company to start its own station there, WTOL, on an application filed in 1936, finding that the proposals for new stations in Toledo proper on 1200 kHz would not be subject to the same interference concerns.

Becoming WHIZ
Ronald B. Woodyard, who served as general manager, president and majority stockholder of the WALR Broadcasting Corporation from 1937 to 1939, left WALR to run WSMK in Dayton. He transferred his shares in the company to the West Virginia Broadcasting Company, a subsidiary of Fort Industry. On November 19, 1939, WALR adopted its present call sign of WHIZ. New studio facilities were built in the Lind Arcade downtown, while the transmitter was relocated. WHIZ also joined NBC, having been briefly affiliated with CBS since the start of the year; it was the 180th affiliate of the network. The station was allowed to go to 250 watts in 1940, and it relocated to 1240 kHz with NARBA in 1941.

After World War II, the Littick family—then publishers of the local Times Recorder and Signal newspapers—purchased WHIZ in 1947. It expanded from an AM station into a radio and television operation. Television came to southeastern Ohio on May 23, 1953, when WHIZ-TV (channel 50, later moved to 18) began broadcasting. In 1961, WHIZ-FM 102.5 began broadcasting. All three originated from the same tower, a site on Downard Road selected a year before the launch of the television station. The AM station was not neglected, increasing power to 1,000 watts in 1962. It later relocated to another site in 2003 as part of the replacement of the FM/TV mast for digital television use.

WHIZ AM-FM remained an NBC affiliate for nearly 60 years, switching to ABC News Radio in April 1999 after Westwood One (NBC Radio's corporate parent) discontinued production of hourly newscasts.

Sale to Marquee Broadcasting
In April 2022, the sale of the entire WHIZ Media Group to Marquee Broadcasting was announced after four generations of Littick family ownership. WHIZ-AM-FM and WZVL would be Marquee's first radio properties. WHIZ president Hank Littick made the decision to sell their broadcasting assets following recent ownership consolidation throughout the television industry and selected Marquee, which operates similar small-market television stations in Bowling Green, Kentucky, and Salisbury, Maryland. The sale was completed on July 14, 2022, with Littick concurrently announcing his retirement.

Programming 
Brenda Larrick is the station's lead local music personality; syndicated talk show hosts included Dave Ramsey, Jim Bohannon and Gary Sullivan. WHIZ also live carries play-by-play from the Cincinnati Bengals, Cincinnati Reds, Columbus Blue Jackets and Ohio State Buckeyes radio networks.

Translator
WHIZ rebroadcasts its signal to the following low-power translator:

Notes

References

External links

HIZ
Zanesville, Ohio
Radio stations established in 1924
1924 establishments in Ohio
Full service radio stations in the United States
Marquee Broadcasting